Knaufville is an unincorporated community in Mahoning County, in the U.S. state of Ohio.

History
A post office called Knaufville was established in 1897, and remained in operation until 1901. The Knauf family were local landowners in Ellsworth Township.

References

Unincorporated communities in Mahoning County, Ohio
1897 establishments in Ohio
Unincorporated communities in Ohio